Schnella is a genus of flowering plants in the legume family, Fabaceae. It belongs to the subfamily Cercidoideae. All of its species are neotropical lianas.

Species
Schnella comprises the following species:

Section Schnella Raddi
 Schnella lilacina (Wunderlin & Eilers) Wunderlin
 Schnella maximiliani (Benth.) Wunderlin
 Schnella macrostachya Raddi
 Schnella poiteauana (Vogel) Wunderlin

 Schnella trichosepala (L.P. Queiroz) Wunderlin

Section Caulotretus (DC.) Wunderlin

 Schnella alata (Ducke) Wunderlin
 Schnella altiscandens (Ducke) Wunderlin
 Schnella anamesa (J.F. Macbr.) Wunderlin
 Schnella angulosa (Vogel) Wunderlin
 var. angulosa (Vogel) Wunderlin
 var. bahiana (Vaz) Trethowan & R. Clark
 var. meridionalis (Hoehne) Trethowan & R. Clark

 Schnella carvalhoi (Vaz) Wunderlin

 Schnella confertiflora (Benth.) Wunderlin

 Schnella cupreonitens (Ducke) Wunderlin
 Schnella erythrantha (Ducke) Wunderlin

 Schnella excisa Griseb.
 Schnella glabra (Jacq.) Dugand—Monkey Ladder Vine
 Schnella grazielae (Vaz) Wunderlin
 Schnella guianensis (Aubl.) Wunderlin—Granny backbone
 var. guianensis (Aubl.) Wunderlin
 var. splendens (Kunth) Wunderlin

 Schnella klugii (Standl.) Wunderlin
 Schnella kunthiana (Vogel) Wunderlin

 Schnella longiseta (Fróes) Wunderlin
 Schnella obovata (S.F.Blake) Britton & Rose
 Schnella outimouta (Aubl.) Wunderlin
 Schnella platycalyx (Benth.) Wunderlin
 Schnella porphyrotricha (Harms) Wunderlin
 var. killipiana (J.F. Macbride) Trethowan & R. Clark
 var. porphyrotricha (Harms) Wunderlin
 var. smithiana (Standley) Trethowan & R. Clark
 Schnella pterocalyx (Ducke) Wunderlin
 Schnella reflexa (Schery) Wunderlin
 Schnella riedeliana (Bong.) Wunderlin

 Schnella siqueirae (Ducke) Wunderlin
 Schnella splendens (Kunth) Bentham
 Schnella sprucei (Benth.) Wunderlin

 Schnella surinamensis (Amshoff) Wunderlin
 Schnella uleana (Harms) Wunderlin

Incertae Sedis

 Schnella accrescens (Killip & J.F. Macbr.) Trethowan & R. Clark
 Schnella bahiachalensis Zamora

 Schnella coronata (Bentham) Pittier
 Schnella flexuosa (Moricand) Walpers
 Schnella guentheri (Harms) Trethowan & R. Clark
 Schnella herrerae Britton & Rose
 Schnella hirsutissima (Wunderlin) Trethowan & R. Clark
 Schnella hymenaeifolia (Triana ex Hemsley) Britton & Rose
 var. hymenaeifolia (Triana ex Hemsley) Britton & Rose
 var. stuebeliana (Harms) Trethowan & R. Clark
 Schnella microstachya Raddi
 var. massambabensis (Vaz) Trethowan & R. Clark
 var. microstachya Raddi
 Schnella radiata (Vellozo) Trethowan & R. Clark
 Schnella rutilans (Spruce ex Bentham) Pittier
 Schnella scala-simiae (Sandwith) Trethowan & R. Clark
 Schnella smilacina (Schott ex Sprengel) G. Don
 Schnella stenoloba Britton & Killip

 Schnella vestita (Benth) J.F. Macbride
 Schnella vulpina (Rusby) Trethowan & R. Clark

Species names with uncertain taxonomic status
The status of the following species is unresolved:
 Schnella emarginata Klotzsch
 Schnella macrophylla Griseb.
 Schnella mutisii Britton & Killip
 Schnella nigra Britton & Killip
 Schnella nitida Britton & Killip
 Schnella trinitensis Britton ex R.O.Williams
 Schnella umbriana Britton & Killip
 Schnella versicolor Britton & Killip

References

Cercidoideae
Fabaceae genera